'' (Devanagari: अञ्जली; अंजली''') is a Sanskrit word that means "divine offering". It is not only a given name, but also the name given to the greeting between Hindus, Buddhists and other religions on the Indian subcontinent: hands folded together. It may refer to:

People

Actors
 Anjali (actress) (born 1986), Indian actress
 Anjali Abrol (born 1990), Indian actress
 Anjali Bhimani, Indian-American actress
 Anjali Devi (1927–2014), Indian actress and producer
 Anjali Jay (born 1975), English actress
 Anjali Lavania (born 1986), Indian actress and model
 Anjali Patil (born 1987), Indian actress
 Anjali Sudhakar (born 1972), Indian actress

In other arts
 Anjali Joseph (born 1978), British-Indian author, journalist, and teacher
 Anjali Lavania (born 1986), Indian actress and model
 Anjali Mendes (1946–2010), Indian fashion model
 Anjali Ranadivé (born 1992), Indian singer-songwriter and marine conservationist

In sport
 Anjali Bhagwat (born 1969), Indian shooter
 Anjali Forber-Pratt (born 1984), American wheelchair racer
 Anjali Pendharker (born 1959), Indian cricketer
 Anjali Sharma (cricketer) (born 1956), Indian cricketer

In other fields
 Anjali Damania, Indian anti-corruption activist and politician
 Anjali Gopalan (born 1957), Indian human and animal rights activist
 Anjali Gupta (born 1975 - died 2011), former officer in the Indian Air Force
Anjali Sharma (climate activist) (born 2004), Australian environmentalist
 Anjali Sud, Indian American businesswoman and CEO of Vimeo

Films 
 Anjali (1957 film), directed by Chetan Anand
 Anjali (1977 film), directed by I. V. Sasi
 Anjali (1990 film), directed by Mani Ratnam

Other uses 
 Anjali (2006 TV series), an Indian Tamil-language soap opera
 Anjali (2019 TV series), a Tamil-language television soap opera
 Añjali Mudrā, a hand gesture which consists of putting the palms together in front of the chest
 Anjali Pictures, an Indian film production company

See also
 Anjolie Ela Menon (born 1940), Indian artist
 Anjuli Shukla, Indian cinematographer and director
 Anju (disambiguation)

Hindu given names
Indian feminine given names